Edwin Parker "Cy" Twombly Sr. (June 15, 1897 – December 3, 1974) was an American right-handed pitcher in Major League Baseball who appeared in seven games for the  Chicago White Sox. Born in Groveland, Massachusetts, he attended Lehigh University and Springfield College. He was a swim coach and later Athletic Director of Washington & Lee University in Lexington, Virginia in the late 1950s and early 1960s. His namesake son was a major American artist. He died at age 77 in Savannah, Georgia.

External links

1897 births
1974 deaths
Major League Baseball pitchers
Chicago White Sox players
Baseball players from Massachusetts
People from Groveland, Massachusetts
Lehigh Mountain Hawks baseball players
Springfield Pride baseball players
Washington and Lee University faculty
Sportspeople from Essex County, Massachusetts